David M. Rosen is an American anthropologist.  Rosen holds a J.D. from  Pace University School of Law and a  Ph.D. in anthropology from the  University of Illinois.   He is Professor of Anthropology, at Fairleigh Dickinson University. He lived in Teaneck, New Jersey and now resides in Brooklyn.

Rosen's book, Armies of the Young: Child Soldiers in War and Terrorism, garnered considerable public attention.  The book discusses three case studies:  Jewish children fighting the Germans in World War II, child soldiers in Sierra Leone, and Palestinian child fighters both in the 1930s and 1940s and during the First Intifada, in the context of political theories about the ethics of children becoming soldiers.

Rosen was active in the campaign against blood diamonds.

References

Living people
University of Illinois Urbana-Champaign alumni
American anthropologists
Fairleigh Dickinson University faculty
Pace University School of Law alumni
People from Teaneck, New Jersey
University of Illinois alumni
Year of birth missing (living people)
Jewish anthropologists